The Guadiamar is a river of Andalusia, Spain, and a tributary of the Guadalquivir. Its course runs entirely within the Province of Seville, flowing from Sierra Morena through the eastern border of Doñana National Park.

Mining disaster

In 1998, the company Boliden AB was responsible for a major ecological disaster in Spain, when a reservoir of toxic waste near the town of Aznalcóllar, owned by its subsidiary Boliden-Apirsa, broke and spilled its contents into the Agrio River, the main tributary of the Guadiamar. Both rivers became severally contaminated with heavy metals. To recover the ecological diversity of the area, the Corredor Verde del Guadiamar was created, a wildlife corridor which connects Sierra Morena with Doñana.

See also 
 List of rivers of Spain

External links
Report on 1998 toxic waste spillage from CNN
Article on toxic spill from El País 

Guadalquivir
Rivers of Andalusia